Francisco Miguel Huerta Vidal (born 11 December 1967) is a Chilean football manager and former footballer who played as a midfielder for clubs in Chile and Peru.

Club career
A product of Colo-Colo youth system, Huerta was loaned to Alianza Lima for the 1988 season after the tragic plane crash that suffered the Peruvian squad on 8 December 1987, alongside his fellows José Letelier, Parcko Quiroz and René Pinto. The deal was for three months, but he stayed in Peru all the year. He made his debut against Coronel Bolognesi on 3 January 1988, playing alongside Teófilo Cubillas.

In 1993, he played for Deportes Iquique in the Chilean top division.

He retired at the age of 29.

Coaching career
He also has worked for the youth ranks of Deportes Temuco and San Antonio Unido as well as the head coach of both. In 2019 he assumed as the head coach of San Antonio Unido, replacing Freddy Ferragut.

Personal life
As a player of Alianza Lima, he was nicknamed El Rey de la Huacha (The King of the Nutmeg).

Huerta married the daughter of the Alianza Lima's president, Agustín Merino, and they had a daughter. Then, they divorced and Huerta had another two daughters with the partner with whom he returned to his homeland in 2005.

In Peru, he managed a coffin factory.

Honours
 Torneo Zonal:

References

External links
 
 Francisco Huerta at CTFutbol.cl 
 Francisco Huerta at EnelCamarin.cl 

1967 births
Living people
Footballers from Santiago
Chilean footballers
Chilean expatriate footballers
Colo-Colo footballers
Club Alianza Lima footballers
Trasandino footballers
Deportivo Sipesa footballers
Cienciano footballers
Deportes Copiapó footballers
Chilean Primera División players
Primera B de Chile players
Peruvian Primera División players
Chilean expatriate sportspeople in Peru
Expatriate footballers in Peru
Association football midfielders
Chilean football managers
Deportes Temuco managers
Segunda División Profesional de Chile managers